The 1967 Tampa Spartans football team represented the University of Tampa in the 1967 NCAA College Division football season. It was the Spartans' 31st season. The team was led by head coach Sam Bailey, in his fourth year, and played their home games at Phillips Field for their first two home games and then at Tampa Stadium for their final five home games in Tampa, Florida. They finished with a record of two wins and seven losses (2–7). The 1967 season is noted for the dedication of Tampa Stadium in the Spartans' 38–0 loss against Tennessee.

Schedule

References

Tampa
Tampa Spartans football seasons
Tampa Spartans football